The Ditmas Avenue station is a local station on the IND Culver Line of the New York City Subway. Located at the intersection of Ditmas and McDonald Avenues in Kensington, Brooklyn, it is served by the F train at all times and the <F> train during rush hours in the peak direction.

History 
This station opened at 3:00 a.m. on March 16, 1919, as part of the opening of the first section of the BMT Culver Line. The initial section began at the Ninth Avenue station and ended at the Kings Highway station. The line was operated as a branch of the Fifth Avenue Elevated line, with a free transfer at Ninth Avenue to the West End Line into the Fourth Avenue Subway. The opening of the line resulted in reduced travel times between Manhattan and Kings Highway. Construction on the line began in 1915, and cost a total of $3.3 million. Trains from this station began using the Fourth Avenue Subway to the Nassau Street Loop in Lower Manhattan when that line opened on May 30, 1931. The Fifth Avenue Elevated was closed on May 31, 1940, and elevated service ceased stopping here. On October 30, 1954, the connection between the IND South Brooklyn Line at Church Avenue and the BMT Culver Line at Ditmas Avenue opened. With the connection completed, all service at the stations on the former BMT Culver Line south of Ditmas Avenue, including this one, were from then on served by IND trains.

North of Ditmas Avenue, the Culver Line expands into four tracks, two local, and two express tracks and enters the tunnel into Church Avenue, allowing access to IND lines in the other boroughs. Before 1954, the Coney Island-bound platform was formerly an island platform with an extra track. Afterward, the BMT Culver Line north of Ditmas Avenue was reduced to a single-track shuttle. The shuttle ceased operation on May 11, 1975 due to decreasing ridership and most of the structure above 37th-38th Streets were demolished. The fourth track at Ditmas Avenue was removed and the Coney Island-bound platform was converted to a side platform.

From June 1968 to 1987, express service on the elevated portion of the line from Church Avenue to Kings Highway operated in the peak direction (to Manhattan AM; to Brooklyn PM), with some F trains running local and some running express. During this time period, this station was used as a local station. Express service ended in 1987, largely due to budget constraints and complaints from passengers at local stations. Express service on the elevated Culver Line was ended due to necessary structural work, but never restored.

Station layout

This elevated station, opened on March 16, 1919, has three tracks and two side platforms. The center track is not used in revenue service. Both platforms have beige windscreens along their entire lengths except for a small section at the north end. Brown canopies with green frames and support columns run along the center of the platforms. The station signs are in the standard black plates in white lettering. There is an abandoned tower on the extreme south end of the Manhattan-bound platform.

Along the west side of McDonald Avenue, the remains of the Culver Shuttle's fourth track are visible behind the windscreens of the Coney Island-bound platform and more remains show the two-track turnoff just before entering Ditmas Avenue.

Exits
This station has two entrances/exits, both of which are elevated station houses beneath the tracks. The full-time one is at the south end. Two staircases from each platform outside the canopies go down to a waiting area/crossover, where a turnstile bank of three provides entrance/exit from the station. Outside fare control, there is a token booth and two staircases going down to either southern corners of McDonald Avenue and Ditmas Avenue.

The other station house at the north end also has one staircase from each platform, a waiting area/crossover, and two staircases going down to either side of McDonald Avenue between Cortelyou Road and Ditmas Avenue. However, the station house is unstaffed, containing two High Entry/Exit Turnstiles. Both station house balconies have a high turnstile to allow passengers to enter or exit the station without having to go through the station house. The one on the Manhattan-bound staircase is entry and exit while the one on the Coney Island-bound staircase is exit-only.

Track layout 
South of the station there is a double crossover between the southbound local track and the center express track. Also south of this station, there is a switch from the center express track to the northbound local track. There was formerly a switch to the south of the station, from the shuttle track to the southbound local track.

North of the station, the three tracks expand into four tracks. The express tracks split in two, and simultaneously with this split, there is a switch from the northbound local track to the northbound express track, as well as a switch where the southbound express and local tracks merge. The extra track is the southbound local track from Church Avenue, which merges with the southbound express track just north of this station.

References

External links 

 
 Station Reporter — F Train
 The Subway Nut — Ditmas Avenue Pictures
 Ditmas Avenue entrance from Google Maps Street View
 Cortelyou Road entrance from Google Maps Street View
 Platforms from Google Maps Street View

IND Culver Line stations
BMT Culver Line stations
New York City Subway stations in Brooklyn
Railway stations in the United States opened in 1919
1919 establishments in New York City